602nd Aircraft Design Institute is a Chinese design institute and jointer partners with Xian Aircraft Industry Corporation of military aircraft. The institute is located at 20 Renmin Road in Yanliang District of Xian near the Yanliang Air Base.

Their key clients are the People's Liberation Army Naval Air Force and the People's Liberation Army Air Force.

They are a main contractor for the Xian JH-7, a two-seater twin-engine fighter-bomber in service with the People's Liberation Army Naval Air Force (PLANAF).

Products
 Xian JH-7 - tandem fighter-bomber

References

Aerospace companies of China
Companies with year of establishment missing